was a private junior college in Kashima city, Ibaraki Prefecture, Japan.  It was set up in 1984. It was set up to enhance local development of the industrial economy. Student recruitment ended in fiscal year 2001 and the school closed in 2003.

Subject 
 English department

Universities and colleges in Ibaraki Prefecture
Educational institutions established in 1984
Japanese junior colleges
Private universities and colleges in Japan
1984 establishments in Japan
2003 disestablishments in Japan